Guckeen is an unincorporated community in Faribault County, in the U.S. state of Minnesota.

History
Guckeen was originally called Derby, and under the latter name was laid out in 1900. A post office was established as Guckeen in 1901, and remained in operation until it was discontinued in 1973. The present name of Guckeen is the surname of an early settler.

References

Unincorporated communities in Faribault County, Minnesota